Lil' Kim: Countdown to Lockdown is a reality television series which premiered on March 9, 2006 on BET. The 6-part show followed Lil' Kim's last 14 days of freedom before she entered the Federal Detention Center in Philadelphia, Pennsylvania for a 366-day sentence.

The series never got an official DVD release. It was however released on iTunes in late 2006. It has since been taken down for unknown reasons.

Cast members 
 Lil' Kim
 Hillary Weston - Kim's manager
 Kirk Fraser - Video director
 Nate Bassett - Kim's personal assistant 
 Latisha 'Lala' Crosby - Kim's cousin/personal assistant
 Gene Nelson - A&R executive for Queen Bee Records
L. Londell McMillan - Kim's attorney
Tracy Nguyen - Kim's publicist

Production and broadcast 
The original title for the television series was "Lil' Kim Goes to the Big House" and was produced by Queen Bee Productions and Tracey Edmonds of Edmonds Entertainment. The show was filmed in September 2005. Edmonds stated in the Daily Variety that several networks have expressed interest. BET picked the series up and re-titled the show "Countdown To Lockdown".

Almost six months after Lil' Kim's incarceration, the show premiered on BET on March 9, 2006 and, at the time, was the most watched series debut in BET's 25 year-history with 1.9 million viewers nationwide. It was also the highest rated cable original series among black viewers
that year. Filming for the second series began shortly after Lil' Kim was released from prison but for unknown reasons, the project was cancelled.

Promotion 
On March 8, 2006, the entire cast (with the exception of Lil' Kim) appeared on The Tyra Banks Show and discussed the show before its BET premiere.

Episodes

References

External links
 

BET original programming
2000s American reality television series
2006 American television series debuts
2006 American television series endings
African-American reality television series